13th arrondissement may refer to:
13th arrondissement of Marseille
13th arrondissement of Paris
13th arrondissement of the Littoral Department, Benin

Arrondissement name disambiguation pages